"Photograph" is a song by American rapper J. Cole, released on April 20, 2018 from his fifth studio album, KOD.

Lyrical interpretation
Pitchfork said "Cole simplifies lust on "Photograph," where he again reminds us that his ideal woman is a holy Madonna who is sexy but never shows too much skin." Spin said it "renders lust as it plays out on social media when the object of affection is a complete stranger."

Critical reception
Alexis Petridis of The Guardian said "there's something really haunting about Photograph, with its delicate two-note guitar sample and a chorus whose vocal appears to be slightly out of step with the beat."

Charts

Certifications

References

2018 songs
J. Cole songs
Songs written by J. Cole
Song recordings produced by J. Cole